King Rib is an item of food commonly served in fish and chips shops in Scotland and Northern England.
Despite its name, it is actually a sweetened patty of minced pork that is fried or deep-fried and often available as a "supper" combination meal, i.e. with chips. It is popular in Scotland to purchase a single king rib along with two buttered rolls, splitting the rib accordingly.

See also

 List of deep fried foods
 List of pork dishes

References

Pork dishes
Scottish cuisine
Deep fried foods